Gutter Sound is a location in Orkney, Scotland, part of the vast anchorage of Scapa Flow.  It lies to the west of the main harbour between the internal islands of Cava and Fara, and the large outer island of Hoy. Gutter Sound was the one of the sites of the mass-scuttling of the interned Imperial German High Seas Fleet in 1919,  and the scene of a major salvage operation in the 1920s. Today the remaining wrecks make the Sound a popular diving location.

Location
Gutter Sound is a body of water some four miles long and a mile wide at its widest point, and has a depth of around 30 meters in places. It separates Hoy and Cava in the north, and Hoy and Fara in the south, opening onto the Flow between Cava and Fara. 
In the north it opens out into the Bring Deeps, while the south it joins Weddell Sound, between Fara and Flotta, and to Switha Sound, between Flotta and Hoy.

History

At the end of the First World War Scapa Flow was the anchorage for the surrendered German High Seas Fleet; these vessels were anchored around the island of Cava, in the Sound itself and in the Flow between Cava and the Barrel of Butter skerry. In 1919 this was the scene of the fleet's mass scuttling. 12 capital ships and a number of smaller vessels went down in the Sound itself, the remainder in deep water between Cava and the skerry.

A number of the sunken ships were salvaged by Ernest Cox during the 1920s. He used a variety of techniques, lifting the smaller ships with floating dry docks and hawsers. With the larger ships he patched all of the holes and then pumped the hulls with compressed air to force out the water and make them float upside down. Seven of the wrecks are still at Scapa Flow, and are protected as maritime scheduled ancient monuments. 

Commercial salvage work on the vessels ceased in the late 1970s and further salvage is no longer technically possible. 

Lyness is now the site of a Naval Cemetery, and a Heritage Centre detailing these events. it is also the site of a Dive Centre, as the seven vessels that remain are a popular target for divers.

Diving the wrecks
Today the seven remaining wrecks, though deep, make for popular and interesting dives for skilled scuba divers.  In addition, debris and wreckage left from the ships salvaged is sometimes dived as well.

Notes

References
 Rayner, Denys: Escort: The Battle of the Atlantic. London:Kimber 1955 (reprinted Annapolis:U.S. Naval Institute Press 1999)

External links
 The Grand Scuttle: The sinking of the German Fleet at Scapa Flow in 1919. Hodder and Stoughton, London, 1982

Landforms of Orkney
History of Orkney
Royal Navy shore establishments
Underwater diving sites in Scotland
Ports and harbours of Scotland
Protected Wrecks of Scotland
Scheduled monuments in Scotland
Sounds of Scotland
Archaeology of Scotland
Scapa Flow